Jane McDonald is the debut album by British singer Jane McDonald. It was released in 1998 by Focus Music International and peaked at number one on the UK Albums Chart. It also reached number 44 in New Zealand in April 1999.

Track listing
"One Moment in Time" – 4:40
"The Twelfth of Never" – 4:41
"Do You Know the Way to San Jose" – 3:35
"You're My World" – 3:06
"How Do I Live" – 3:56
"(You Make Me Feel Like a) Natural Woman" – 3:11
"The Wind Beneath My Wings" – 4:21
"Downtown" – 3:32
"Have I Told You Lately" – 4:50
"When I Fall in Love" – 3:31
"I'll Never Love This Way Again" – 4:01
"Some You Win Some You Lose" – 3:48
"You Don't Have to Say You Love Me" – 2:50
"I Will Always Love You" – 4:35

Charts

Weekly charts

Year-end charts

Certifications

References

1998 debut albums
Covers albums